Springer Municipal Airport  is a town owned, public use airport located one nautical mile (2 km) south of the central business district of Springer, a town in Colfax County, New Mexico, United States. It is included in the National Plan of Integrated Airport Systems for 2011–2015, which categorized it as a general aviation facility.

Facilities and aircraft 
Springer Municipal Airport covers an area of 108 acres (44 ha) at an elevation of 5,891 feet (1,796 m) above mean sea level. It has one runway designated 1/19 with an asphalt surface measuring 5,003 by 60 feet (1,525 x 18 m). For the 12-month period ending April 30, 2010, the airport had 30 aircraft operations, an average of 2 per month: 67% general aviation and 33% military.

References

External links 
 Aerial image as of September 1997 from USGS The National Map
 

Airports in New Mexico
Buildings and structures in Colfax County, New Mexico
Transportation in Colfax County, New Mexico